Shashi Bhusan Behera is an Indian politician from the Biju Janata Dal party. He is the Finance and excise minister of Odisha State. He was a former member of Rajya Sabha and Member of the Legislative Assembly of Odisha. Former General Secretary and Vice–President of State Yuva Janata Dal, President Orissa Dalit Sena, Vice President Samatamancha, State Executive Member H.M.S. (Hindu Mazdoor Sabha), General Secretary All Orissa Kaibarta Mahasangha, Founder Secretary of Cuttack Homeopathic Medical College and Hospital. Elected Member of National Telephone Advisory Committee in 2001 to 2002.

Shashi also has served as a member of Rajya Sabha from 2010 to 2014 and leader of Biju Janata Dal from Rajya Sabha 2012–2014. He has served as member of 13th Odisha Legislative Assembly from Balianta & Balipatna constituency which was later named as Jaydev constituency in the name of famous poet Jaydev. Behera was also once from Khordha district from Bhubaneswar, member Zonal Railway Recruitment Board (South Eastern Railway 1997–1999), Member F.C.I. Advisory Committee Orissa 2003 to onwards. Now, Holding the portfolio of Minister Finance & Excise, Agriculture & Farmers' Empowerment, Fisheries & Animal Resources Development Government of Odisha.

He has always fought for the poor & marginalised section peoples. He lives life with a motto "Simple living, high thinking, being dedicated to work and development of his peoples".

Early life and education 
Shashi Bhusan fondly called as "Mantu" by his mother was born on 12 Feb 1953 to Madhusudan Behera and Harshamani Behera of village Nuapatna. Born at Jobra, Cuttack, Shashi's first school was his Patitapaban School, Jobra where he received his elementary education later he shifted to Nuapatna where he received his Secondary Education at Banguari High School. Upon passing the 10th Examination (which then was 11th Class Examination) he was admitted to Ravenshaw University for further higher education. Not a student with excellent scores but definitely a brilliant one with a vision. In a short span of time his leadership attracted many and he was regarded and respected by many of his fellow mates, who would look up to him for suggestions.

During his early days of university he was attracted to the social justice movement and wanted to work for the poor and neglected section of people. And it is due to this that he was never attracted to the alluring jobs of his time. Working for the development of the fishermen's and the labourer's of different fields became his day-to-day activities and getting them to the mainstream society became his aim.

On 10 February 1989, he was married toSuprabha Mohanty, who supported him in not only his profession but also took care of his family. He admits that it is truly said "Behind a successful man there is a women" and do credits his success to his wife.

The political era in Odisha was going on for a major revamp, the beginning of Naveen after the super cyclone of Odisha can be seen.

Political career 
Shashi from the very beginning of his university days was detrimental of working for the people not for the corporate boss or the executive boss. He wanted to work for the upliftment of peoples who were not regarded as the part of the mainstream society. And it is because of his and Sj Akulananda Behera’s effort that the fisherman society was included in the Schedule Caste category of Odisha and that the poor and innocent peoples who never were regarded as part of the mainstream society now started to be included.

The non-corrupt and non-compromising ideology of Shashi’s stopped him from compromising and joining the power politics of state. But destiny was to play his role. With the death of the Legendary Biju Pattnaik and to fill the vacuum created Sj Naveen Patnaik came to Odisha whose thought ideology and working forced Shashi to rethink his decision and he meet Sj. Naveen Pattnaik in the year 2000, who at once like him and wanted him to contest from Balipatna Electoral Constituency. As destiny wanted something else, he could not contest the 2000 election. But Naveenji has set his mind, came the 2004 and Shashi was elected from Balianta & Balipatna Electoral Constituency on Biju Janata Dal Ticket. And he never disappointed Naveenji (the most loved and respected leader of Odisha). In 2005 he was selected by the Speaker among the Members of the State Legislative Assembly to be awarded the Prestigious Utkalmani Gopabandhu Samman for the Best Legislator in the assembly. The worked for the development of the peoples of Balianta and Balipatna, his non-corrupt and non-compromising inspired many, and he was engulfed in the development of his constituency. It was his effort and vision that the Balianta and Balipatna Constituency was named after ‘Jaydev’ the famous poet who Gita Govinda is recited before lord Jagannath every day. Came the year of 2009, he was confident of his work and effort and that the leader would surely re-elect him. But Naveen ji wanted his man in Delhi, he instructed Shashi to work for the party in the forthcoming election and Shashi with a heavy heart never denied Naveenji and always worked with dedication to serve his people and party. In the year 2010 Naveenji surprised Shashi with a ticket to the upper house of Parliament (the Rajya Sabha). And made him also the leader of Biju Janata Dal Parliamentary Party in Rajya Sabha. With the Changing scenario in Odisha fast shaping Sj. Naveen Patnaik wanted Shashi in Odisha and thus was called in the midst of his term to contest from "Jaydev". He was elected to the State Legislative Assembly on Biju Janata Dal Ticket from Jaydev Constituency.

Shashi a confidant of Sj. Naveen Patnaik was given the charge of two important Ministry of Finance and Excise and was later given with Public Enterprise and upon the resignation of the Agriculture Minister was given with additional charge of Ministry of Agriculture and Farmers' Empowerment, Fisheries & Animal Resources Development. Now he is also the Chairman of many Ministerial Committees.

References 

1953 births
Living people
Samata Party politicians
Janata Dal politicians
Biju Janata Dal politicians
Odisha MLAs 2019–2024
Odisha MLAs 2014–2019